Pteranodontia is an extinct group of ornithocheiroid pterodactyloid pterosaurs that lived during the Late Cretaceous period (Coniacian to Maastrichtian stages) of North America and Africa. They were some of the most advanced pterosaurs, and possessed highly specialized cranial crests that may have served as sexual attraction, with males having a much larger crest.

Classification
Pteranodontia was originally named by Marsh in 1876. In 2003, it was given a phylogenetic definition by David Unwin as the common ancestor of Pteranodon and Nyctosaurus plus all its descendants. Though Marsh had originally named this group based on the shared absence of teeth in those species, most analyses show that all of the traditional "ornithocheiroid" pterosaurs are also members of this clade.

Below is a cladogram showing the phylogenetic placement of this group from Andres and Myers (2013).

In 2018, Longrich, Martill, and Andres revisited the classification and proposed a different hypothesis based on a new phylogenetic analysis. Following Marsh's original classification, they restricted Pteranodontia to the families Pteranodontidae and Nyctosauridae. They also replaced Pteranodontia with Pteranodontoidea as the more inclusive group.

In 2022, Fernandes et al. described Epapatelo as a new pteranodontian from Angola. Including Epapatelo in the phylogenetic analysis of Longrich et al. (2018), they recovered a new clade, Aponyctosauria, composed of the Nyctosauridae, Alcione, Simurghia, and Epapatelo.

Paleobiology

Locomotion
Similar to other pterosaurs, pteranodontian are considered to have been skilled fliers as well as adept at moving on the ground. Evidence from footprints shows that most pterosaurs did not sprawl their limbs to a large degree, as in modern reptiles, but rather held the limbs relatively erect when walking, like dinosaurs. Footprints of pteranodontians are still unknown, but it is likely that they also walked erect. Among pterosaurs, pteranodontians had unusually uneven limb proportions, with the forelimbs much larger and longer than the hind limbs. This would likely have required them to use unique modes of locomotion when on the ground compared to other pterosaurs. Most pteranodontians like Pteranodon flew like modern day albatrosses, which consists of flying very long distances and rarely flapping.

"Wyomingopteryx"
The name "Wyomingopteryx" appears in a painting of Morrison prehistoric animals by Robert Bakker. However, this binomen is a nomen nudum, and it is possible that Bakker may have intended to coin "Wyomingopteryx" for the Istiodactylus-like specimen TATE 5999 because that specimen is found in Wyoming.

References

 
Barremian first appearances
Campanian extinctions